Kurzamra is a genus of flowering plant in the family Lamiaceae, first described in 1891. It contains only one known species, Kurzamra pulchella, native to Chile and northwestern Argentina.

References

Lamiaceae
Flora of Chile
Flora of Argentina
Monotypic Lamiaceae genera